The 2014 Campeonato Alagoano de Futebol was the 84th season of Alagoas's top professional football league. The competition began on January 12 and ended on April 30. Coruripe were the champions for the 3rd time. Penedense and Comercial-AL were relegated.

Format

In the first stage, 8 teams play in a double round-robin format. The best four teams face each other in the playoffs, and the winner qualified for the 2015 Copa do Brasil.

On the second stage, the 8 teams are joined by CRB and CSA which were playing on 2014 Copa do Nordeste. The two best teams qualify to the 2015 Copa do Brasil and 2015 Copa do Nordeste, and the best team qualifies to the 2014 Campeonato Brasileiro Série D. The 10 teams are split in two groups, with the two best from each group facing on the final stage.

Participating teams

Corinthians Alagoano merged with Santa Rita for this season. Thus the 3rd place of 2nd division, Penedense, was promoted.

First round (Copa Alagoas)

Results

Final stage

Semifinals

First leg

Second leg

Final

Second round (Copa Maceió)

Group A

Group B

Results

Final stage

Semifinals

First leg

Second leg

Final

Second round final standings

Top goalscorers

Source:

References

External links
 Official site

Alagoano
Campeonato Alagoano